The Indian National Carbon Trading Scheme is a carbon emission trading scheme being developed by the  Bureau of Energy Efficiency in India,  which may start as a voluntary market in 2023. It is expected to start trading existing Renewable Energy Certificates (REC) and Energy Savings Certificates (ESC) by 2025 and for these to become Carbon Credit Certificates by 2026. It was legislated in 2022. It has been suggested that mandatory carbon allowances could be included in future so that it would become a carbon market similar to the Chinese and EU ETS. The director of the bureau says that it will become the world's largest carbon market by 2030.

References 

Emissions trading
Climate change in India
Energy in India